José Maria dos Reis Pereira, better known by the pen name José Régio (17 September 1901, Vila do Conde – 22 December 1969, Vila do Conde), was a Portuguese writer who spent most of his life in Portalegre (1929 to 1962).

Biography
In 1927 he founded the magazine Presença which would come to be a cornerstone of the  movement in Portugal, of which he was the main spokesperson. Aside from this magazine he also made contributions to newspapers such as the Diário de Notícias and the Comércio do Porto.

He was defiant of the Estado Novo regime and was a member of the Movimento de Unidade Democrática (Movement of Democratic Unity), supporting Norton de Matos in his bid for the Portuguese presidency.

As a writer, José Régio was the author of novels, plays, poetry and essays. His works are strongly focused on the theme of conflict between Man and God and between Individual and Society; in a critical analysis of solitude and human relations. As an essayist, he dedicated himself to the study of Camões and Florbela Espanca.

Published works

Poetry
 1925 - Poemas de Deus e do Diabo.
 1929 - Biografia.
 1935 - As Encruzilhadas de Deus.
 1945 - Fado (1941), Mas Deus é Grande.
 1954 - A Chaga do Lado.
 1961 - Filho do Homem.
 1968 - Cântico Suspenso.
 1970 - Música Ligeira.
 1971 - Colheita da Tarde.

Fiction
 1934 - Jogo da Cabra-Cega.
 1941 - Davam Grandes Passeios aos Domingos.
 1942 - O Príncipe com Orelhas de Burro.
 1945 to 1966 - A Velha Casa.
 1946 - Histórias de Mulheres, The Flame-Coloured Dress, UK, 1999 (+ Davam Grandes Passeios...) 
 1962 - Há Mais Mundos.

Essays
 1936 - Críticas e Criticados.
 1938 - António Botto e o Amor.
 1940 - Em Torno da Expressão Artística.
 1952 - As Correntes e as Individualidades na Moderna Poesia Portuguesa.
 1964 - Ensaios de Interpretação Crítica.
 1967 - Três Ensaios sobre Arte.
 1977 - Páginas de Doutrina e Crítica da Presença.

Plays
 1940 - Jacob e o Anjo.
 1947 - Benilde ou a Virgem-Mãe.
 1949 - El-Rei Sebastião.
 1954 - A Salvação do Mundo.
 1957 - Três Peças em Um Acto.

External links
 Complete Biography in PT - Instituto Camões
 Biography and some poems - As Tormentas
 

1901 births
1969 deaths
20th-century Portuguese poets
Portuguese male poets
Portuguese Roman Catholics
Roman Catholic writers
People from Vila do Conde
People from Portalegre, Portugal
20th-century male writers
20th-century pseudonymous writers